Ronald Douglas Tucker (30 June 1921 – 10 April 1986) was an Australian rules footballer who played for  and  in the Western Australian National Football League (WANFL). Playing in a number of positions, though primarily at centre half-forward, Tucker kicked a total of 803 goals in 215 WANFL games between 1940 and 1955, and 32 goals in 14 games for Western Australia in interstate matches. Tucker was named in Perth's Team of the Century in 1998, and was inducted into the West Australian Football Hall of Fame in 2009.

Career
He served as a driver in the 52 Australian Transport Platoon during World War II, and also played army football. He was also a noted athlete, winning the Northern Territory 120 yds. hurdles championship in 1944, and the New Britain 200 yds. championship in 1945. Tucker returned to Perth for the 1946 season. Tucker played in losing Grand Finals in both 1949, against , and 1950, against . Tucker kicked 115 goals in 1950 to be the WANFL's leading goalkicker, which is a Perth record. In 18 games at the club, playing either as a goalsneak or as a follower, he kicked 65 goals to lead the club's goalkicking. He transferred back to Perth for the 1953 season, and returned to form, kicking 87 goals. He again led the club's goalkicking in 1954 and 1955, with 44 and 52 goals in each respective season, but was dropped to the reserves several times.

Tucker died at Royal Perth Hospital on 10 April 1986, and was buried at Karrakatta Cemetery. In 1999, he was named at centre half-forward in Perth's Team of Century, and was posthumously inducted into the West Australian Football Hall of Fame in 2009.

Reputation
Tucker was considered the equal of leading full-forwards such as Bernie Naylor and John Coleman, and was considered superior to Naylor at ground level. Tucker played at either centre half-forward or full-forward in every interstate and carnival match for the WANFL between 1947 and 1950, kicking 32 goals.

References

1921 births
1986 deaths
Australian Army personnel of World War II
Australian people of English descent
Burials at Karrakatta Cemetery
Australian rules footballers from Perth, Western Australia
Perth Football Club players
Subiaco Football Club players
West Australian Football Hall of Fame inductees